This is a list of notable events in the history of LGBT rights that took place in the year 1991.

Events
 U.S. state of Connecticut bans sexual orientation discrimination in the private sector.
 U.S. state of Hawaii bans sexual orientation discrimination in the private sector.

January 
 29 — Minnesota governor Arne Carlson issues an executive order banning sexual orientation discrimination in the public sector.

April
 16 — The United Kingdom Department of Health issued guidance banning social workers from allowing gay couples to become foster parents.

May
 1 — Three same-sex couples file suit in Hawaii alleging that the state constitution guarantees their right to marry.
 19 — The Executive Council of Hong Kong votes to decriminalize homosexuality.

August 
 16 — New Jersey governor James Florio issues an executive order prohibiting sexual orientation discrimination in the public sector.

December
 17 — The Minnesota Court of Appeals, overturning a lower court ruling in In re Guardianship of Kowalski, awards guardianship of Sharon Kowalski, brain-damaged in an accident eight years earlier, to her lesbian partner Karen Thompson.

See also

Timeline of LGBT history — timeline of events from 12,000 BCE to present
LGBT rights by country or territory — current legal status around the world
LGBT social movements

Notes

References
 Eskridge, Jr., William N. (1996). The Case for Same-Sex Marriage: From Sexual Liberty to Civilized Commitment. New York City, The Free Press, a Division of Simon & Schuster. .

LGBT rights
LGBT rights by year
1991 in LGBT history